Cosmic Peekaboo is the eighth album by The Free Design. Released in 2001, it was the sunshine pop group's first album after a long hiatus.

The album features original members - and siblings - Sandy, Chris and Bruce Dedrick, along with Rebecca Pellett.

Track listing
 Peekaboo
 Younger Son
 McCarran Airport
 Destiny
 Springtime
 Listen
 The Hook
 Music Room
 The Only Treasure
 Day Breaks
 Perfect Love

Personnel
Chris Dedrick – vocals, soprano recorder, keyboards, recorder, piano, flugelhorn, percussion, trumpet, Native American drum, rhythm guitar, arranger, producer
Bruce Dedrick – vocals
Sandy Dedrick	– vocals
Rebecca Pellett – vocals, keyboards
Tom Szczesniak – piano, bass
Stefan Szczesniak – drums
Christian Szczesniak – guitar, acoustic guitar
John Johnson – soprano sax
Brian Barlow – percussion, cocktail drums
Mike Francis – guitar
David Swan – piano
Marie Bérard – violin
Griffin Dedrick – guitar
Douglas Perry – viola
Brian Epperson – cello

The Free Design albums
2001 albums